The Limousin septennial ostensions is a series of religious processions in commemoration of the relics of Roman Catholic saints in Limousin, France.

The ostensions were inscribed by UNESCO in 2013 (8.COM) on the Representative List of the Intangible Cultural Heritage of Humanity.

Gallery

References

Catholic liturgy